Syed Hameedha Arts and Science College, is a general degree college located in Kilakarai, Tamil Nadu. It was established in the year 2000. The college is affiliated with Alagappa University. This college offers different courses in arts, commerce and science.

Departments

Science
Physics
Mathematics
Microbiology
Information Technology
Computer Science
Electronics and communication

Arts and Commerce
Tamil
Arbic
English
Business Administration
Commerce

Accreditation
The college is  recognized by the University Grants Commission (UGC).

References

External links

Educational institutions established in 2000
2000 establishments in Tamil Nadu
Colleges affiliated to Alagappa University